Lanistes bicarinatus is a species of large freshwater snail in the family Ampullariidae, the apple snails. It is endemic to the Democratic Republic of the Congo, where it lives in river habitat. This snail is a common species. It is used locally for animal feed.

References

Ampullariidae
Endemic fauna of the Democratic Republic of the Congo
Taxonomy articles created by Polbot